Coconut Island may refer to:

 Coconut Island (Florida)
 Coconut Island (Hawaii Island), in Hilo Bay
 Coconut Island (Oahu Island), in Kaneohe Bay
 Coconut Island (Queensland) 
 another name for St. Martin's Island, Bangladesh

See also 
 Cocos Island (disambiguation)
 Aldabra, coral atoll containing the islands of North Coconut and South Coconut
 Diamond coconut model, hypothetical island economy based on trade in coconuts